Hellinsia lacteolus is a moth of the family Pterophoridae. It is known from Japan (Honshu, Kyushu), North Korea and China.

The length of the forewings is 10–11 mm.

External links
Taxonomic And Biological Studies Of Pterophoridae Of Japan (Lepidoptera)
Japanese Moths

lacteolus
Moths of Asia
Moths of Japan
Moths of Korea
Fauna of North Korea
Moths described in 1963